"Saturday Sun" is a song by Australian singer-songwriter Vance Joy and released on 1 February 2018 as the fourth single from Joy's second studio album Nation of Two. 

Joy explains “I wrote this last year when I was in Malibu. I guess it’s about meeting someone really great and not wanting to miss the chance of seeing them again. When I was writing this song, I was travelling from my little AirBnB in Venice Beach to the studio in Malibu and I got to drive my car on this beautiful stretch of coastal highway and I think that drive inspired some of the lyrics." 

An acoustic version of the song was released on 4 May 2018. 

A Luca Schreiner version of the song was released on 8 June 2018 and a Ryan Riback version on 6 July 2018.

Video 
The video was released on 12 April 2018.

Reception 
Brandon John from Tone Deaf said "In keeping with much of his best work, it’s about as hopeful a tune as you could reasonably ask for, dripping with the optimism of a young romantic as Vance proclaims his new love to the sun over bright acoustic and a swelling horn section."

Track listing

Charts

Weekly charts

Year-end charts

Certifications

References 
 
 

2018 singles 
2017 songs 
Vance Joy songs
Songs written by Dave Bassett (songwriter)
Songs written by Vance Joy